Soda Springs is an unincorporated community in Caldwell County, in the U.S. state of Texas. According to the Handbook of Texas, there were no population estimates made to the community in 2000. It is located within the Greater Austin metropolitan area.

History
Soda Springs was once known as Sour Springs and a post office with that name was established there in 1857 and remained in operation until 1880. It was named that because the nearby springs had a weird taste to it caused by a high sodium carbonate content in the water. It was then changed to Soda Springs. A church and a few scattered houses marked the community on county maps in the 1940s. The community's local springs flowed at a rate of 6.3 liters per second in 1946 but then slowed to only .13 liters per second in 1975. It was labeled on county highway maps in 2000, but it did not have any population estimate in 2000.

Today, a few bridges mark the presence of the community. One of these bridges is a lenticular bridge over Plum Creek on County Road 130. The only way to view it is to climb on limbs, as it is unapproachable on land.

Geography

Education
Soda Springs is served by the Luling Independent School District.

References

Unincorporated communities in Caldwell County, Texas
Unincorporated communities in Texas